The Serbian Revolution was a national uprising that led to the independence of Serbia from the Ottoman Empire.
"Serbian Revolution" may also refer to:
The Anti-bureaucratic revolution
The Log Revolution
The Overthrow of Slobodan Milošević